Olaus Petri Church is a church building in Örebro in Sweden. Belonging to the Örebro Olaus Petri Parish of the Church of Sweden, it was opened on Fourth Advent Sunday 1912.

References

External links

20th-century Church of Sweden church buildings
Churches in Örebro County
Churches completed in 1912
1912 establishments in Sweden
Churches in the Diocese of Strängnäs
Buildings and structures in Örebro